Pitcairnia clarkii is a species of plant in the family Bromeliaceae. It is endemic to Ecuador, where it is known only from the type locality in Esmeraldas Province. It grows in coastal forest in a protected area.

References

clarkii
Endangered plants
Endemic flora of Ecuador
Taxonomy articles created by Polbot